The Jake Award is an annual award presented to North American short line (Class III) railroads by rail transport industry group American Short Line and Regional Railroad Association. The award recognizes railroads with a frequency-severity index (FSI) rating of 0.00, thus having no FRA reportable injuries.

2007 Award Winners 

Aberdeen, Carolina and Western Railway
Alabama and Tennessee River Railway
Alliance Terminal Railroad
Alexander Railroad
Angelina and Neches River Railroad
Ann Arbor Railroad
Appalachian and Ohio Railroad
Arkansas Midland Railroad
Arkansas and Missouri Railroad
Belt Railway of Chicago
Birmingham Southern Railroad
Brandywine Valley Railroad
Brownsville and Rio Grande International Railroad
Cedar Rapids and Iowa City Railway
Central Oregon and Pacific Railroad
Chicago South Shore and South Bend Railroad
Clarendon and Pittsford Railroad
Cloquet Terminal Railroad
Columbia and Cowlitz Railway
Columbus and Ohio River Rail Road
Corpus Christi Terminal Railroad
East Camden and Highland Railroad
Eastern Illinois Railroad
Elgin, Joliet and Eastern Railway
Escanaba and Lake Superior Railroad
Farmrail Corporation
Finger Lakes Railway
Florida Northern Railroad
Georgetown Railroad
Golden Isles Terminal Railroad
Grainbelt Corporation
Great Northwest Railroad
Great Smoky Mountains Railroad
Great Western Railway of Colorado
Huron and Eastern Railway
Idaho Northern and Pacific Railroad
Illinois and Midland Railroad
Indiana Northeastern Railroad
Indiana and Ohio Railway
Iowa Interstate Railroad
Kansas and Oklahoma Railroad
Kaw River Railroad
Kiamichi Railroad
Kyle Railroad
Lake Michigan and Indiana Railroad
Lake State Railway
Lake Superior and Ishpeming Railroad
Louisiana and Delta Railroad
Louisiana Southern Railroad
Manufacturers Railway
Marquette Rail
Maryland and Delaware Railroad
Michigan Shore Railroad
Minnesota, Dakota and Western Railway
Mission Mountain Railroad
Mississippi Export Railroad
Missouri and Northern Arkansas Railroad
Modesto and Empire Traction Company
Montana Rail Link
Morristown and Erie Railway
Nebraska Central Railroad
Nebraska Northeastern Railway
New England Central Railroad
New Orleans Public Belt Railroad
New York and Atlantic Railway
Northern Plains Railroad
Paducah and Louisville Railway
Panhandle Northern Railroad
Patapsco and Back Rivers Railroad
Pioneer Valley Railroad
Port of Tillamook Bay Railroad
Progressive Rail
San Joaquin Valley Railroad
Santa Fe Southern Railway
Savannah Port Terminal Railroad
South Branch Valley Railroad
South Carolina Central Railroad
South Central Florida Express
St. Maries River Railroad
Steelton and Highspire Railroad
Stillwater Central Railroad
Tacoma Rail
Tennessee Southern Railroad
Terminal Railroad Association of St. Louis
Terminal Railway Alabama State Docks
Texas and Northern Railway
Texas North Western Railway
Timber Rock Railroad
Trona Railway
Twin Cities and Western Railroad
Union Railroad
Utah Railway
Vicksburg Southern Railroad
West Tennessee Railroad
Western Maryland Scenic Railroad
Western New York and Pennsylvania Railroad
Wheeling and Lake Erie Railway
Wisconsin and Southern Railroad

References 

Rail transportation in the United States
Rail transport industry awards
Occupational safety and health awards